Charles Plumpton Wilson (12 May 1859  –  9 March 1938) was an English amateur footballer who played at wing-half. He made two appearances for England in 1884. He was also capped for the England national rugby union team in 1881, and was one of only three players to be capped for England at both Association football and rugby football.

Education
Wilson was born in Roydon, Norfolk, the son of the Revd. Plumpton Stravenson Wilson of West Pinchbeck Parsonage, Spalding, Lincolnshire. His sister Mary was the mother of Archbishop Michael Ramsey.

He was educated at Uppingham School and Marlborough College where he was a member of the cricket eleven in 1876 and 1877 and of the football team in 1876.

He went up to Trinity College, Cambridge, where he proved an outstanding all-round sportsman. He represented the University in the twenty-five-mile bicycle race against Oxford in 1879, won his "blue" at rugby football in each of the years from 1877 to 1880, and at cricket in 1880 and 1881.

On graduating, he became an assistant master at Elstree School, Hertfordshire from 1881 to 1898, and from 1898 he was headmaster of Sandroyd School, Cobham, Surrey.

Sporting career

Rugby Union
Wilson came to note as a rugby player when he was selected for the Cambridge University team whilst studying at Trinity. He won four sporting Blues in rugby, playing in The Varsity Match from 1877 to 1880, and was made team captain in the 1880 encounter. He made his solitary international appearance for England in their first match against Wales played on 19 February 1881 at Richardson's Field in Blackheath. England recorded their largest victory, defeating the Welsh 30–0 and scoring 13 tries in the process.

Cricket
He represented Cambridge University ten times in 1880 and 1881. With the bat he only scored 157 runs in the two seasons at an average of 14.27. He was more successful as a right-arm medium pace bowler, taking 22 wickets at an average of 19.95. His best performance came against Surrey in June 1881, when he claimed 5 wickets for 34 runs in Surrey's second innings, as the university won by 9 wickets.

He played minor counties cricket for Lincolnshire in 1880 and for Norfolk from 1881 to 1884.

Football
While teaching at Elstree he joined Hendon Football Club and took part in their FA Cup matches, including that in the 1883–84 First Round on 10 November 1883 when they defeated the previous season's FA Cup finalists Old Etonians 3–2. He also played once for the Corinthian amateur side in a 3–1 victory over Cambridge University on 21 November 1883.

This brought him to the attention of the England selectors, who picked him for the inaugural season Home International Championship match against Scotland on 15 March 1884. In a close match at Cathkin Park, the Scots won 1–0. Despite the defeat, Wilson retained his place for the next match against Wales on 17 March, which England won comfortably 4–0, including two goals from William Bromley-Davenport.

He was thus one of only three players to represent England at both Association football and Rugby football, the others being Reginald Birkett and John Willie Sutcliffe.

Family
His younger brother Geoffrey made two appearances for the England national football team in 1900.

Charles Wilson died at Eckling Grange, East Dereham, Norfolk on 9 March 1938, aged 78.

References

External links
CricketArchive profile
Cricinfo profile
Profile on www.englandstats.com
Profile on www.englandfc.com

1859 births
1938 deaths
Alumni of Trinity College, Cambridge
Association football defenders
Cambridge University cricketers
Cambridge University R.U.F.C. players
Casuals F.C. players
Corinthian F.C. players
Cricketers from Norfolk
England international footballers
England international rugby union players
English cricketers
English footballers
English rugby union players
Footballers from Norfolk
Hendon F.C. players
Lincolnshire cricketers
Norfolk cricketers
People educated at Marlborough College
People educated at Uppingham School
People from King's Lynn and West Norfolk (district)
Rugby union players from Norfolk